Duntroon may refer to:
 Royal Military College, Duntroon, in Canberra, Australia
 Duntroon, Australian Capital Territory, Robert Campbell's property in the suburb of Campbell, Canberra
 Duntroon, Ontario, Canada
 Duntroon, New Zealand
 Duntroon, Scotland
 MV Duntroon, a passenger liner operated from 1935 to 1973, including wartime service as a troopship

See also
Duntrune Castle, also in Scotland